Sredny (masculine), Srednyaya (feminine), or Sredneye (neuter) is the name of several inhabited localities in Russia.

Modern localities
Urban localities
Sredny, Irkutsk Oblast, a work settlement in Usolsky District of Irkutsk Oblast

Rural localities
Sredny, Arkhangelsk Oblast, a settlement in Verkhneshonoshsky Selsoviet of Velsky District of Arkhangelsk Oblast
Sredny, Kaluga Oblast, a selo in Kozelsky District of Kaluga Oblast
Sredny, Krasnodar Krai, a khutor in Alexeye-Tenginsky Rural Okrug of Tbilissky District of Krasnodar Krai
Sredny, Kursk Oblast, a khutor in Vyshnereutchansky Selsoviet of Medvensky District of Kursk Oblast
Sredny, Nizhny Novgorod Oblast, a settlement under the administrative jurisdiction of  the work settlement of imeni Stepana Razina in Lukoyanovsky District of Nizhny Novgorod Oblast
Sredny, Penza Oblast, a settlement in Golitsynsky Selsoviet of Nizhnelomovsky District of Penza Oblast
Sredny, Samara Oblast, a settlement in Isaklinsky District of Samara Oblast
Sredny, Alexandrovsky District, Stavropol Krai, a khutor in Srednensky Selsoviet of Alexandrovsky District of Stavropol Krai
Sredny, Krasnogvardeysky District, Stavropol Krai, a khutor in Rodykovsky Selsoviet of Krasnogvardeysky District of Stavropol Krai
Sredny, Tula Oblast, a settlement in Prigorodny Rural Okrug of Plavsky District of Tula Oblast

Historical localities
Srednyaya, a colony included in Alexandrovskaya Volost of Alexandrovsky Uyezd of Arkhangelsk Governorate of the Russian SFSR upon its establishment in 1920

ru:Средний#Топоним